Surry County is a county located in the U.S. state of North Carolina. As of the 2020 census, the population was 71,359. Its county seat is Dobson, and its largest city is Mount Airy.

Surry county comprises the Mount Airy, NC Micropolitan Statistical Area, which is also included in the Greensboro-Winston-Salem-High Point, NC Combined Statistical Area.

History
The county was formed in 1771 from Rowan County as part of the British Province of North Carolina. It was named for the county of Surrey in England, birthplace of William Tryon, Governor of North Carolina from 1765 to 1771.

In 1777 parts of Surry County and Washington District (now Washington County, Tennessee) were combined to form Wilkes County. The first permanent courthouse was established at Richmond in 1779, what is now the modern-day Old Richmond Township in Forsyth County near Donnaha. However, in 1789 the eastern half of Surry County became Stokes County, thus making the Richmond site unusable for either county. In 1790, the county seat was moved to Rockford where it remained for over half a century. In 1850 the half of the county's remaining territory south of the Yadkin River became Yadkin County. The town of Dobson was established in 1853 to be the new county seat.

Geography

The whole county is generally considered part of the Piedmont Triad metropolitan area. Surry County is located in the Yadkin Valley AVA, an American Viticultural Area. Wines made from grapes grown in Surry County may carry the appellation Yadkin Valley on their label.

Mountains 
Surry County is located both within the Piedmont region of central North Carolina and in the Appalachian Mountains region of western North Carolina. Most of the eastern two-thirds of the county lies within the Piedmont, a region of gently rolling hills and valleys. However, the Piedmont of Surry County also contains a small portion of the Sauratown Mountains; Surry County marks the western end of the Sauratown Mountain range. The western third of the county lies within the Blue Ridge Mountains, and they dominate the county's western horizon. The mountain passes (called "gaps" locally) are notorious for their occasional high winds, which can force automobiles and even large Eighteen wheeler trucks off the highways which lead through the passes. As a result, high wind advisories issued by the National Weather Service are not uncommon. However, the best-known peak in Surry County is not the highest. That honor goes to Pilot Mountain, an isolated monadnock and a North Carolina landmark.

Another notable peak in Surry County is Cumberland Knob, in the northwestern corner of the county, which was the starting point of the construction of the Blue Ridge Parkway. The following table provides a list of some of the more prominent mountains of the county.

Major water bodies

 Ararat River
 Bear Creek
 Big Creek
 Camp Creek
 Fisher River
 Flat Shoal Creek (Ararat River tributary)
 Grassy Creek
 Hogan Creek
 King Creek
 Little Fisher Creek
 Mill Creek
 Mitchell River
 Pauls Creek (Stewarts Creek tributary)
 Pheasant Creek (Fisher River tributary)
 Pilot Creek (Ararat River tributary)
 Ramey Creek
 Stewarts Creek (Ararat River tributary)
 Toms Creek (Ararat River tributary)
 Yadkin River
While there are many creeks and streams in Surry County, there are three recognized major rivers in the county, the Ararat, the Fisher, and the Mitchell. All three flow southward and are tributaries of the Yadkin River, which forms the southern border of Surry County. The Yadkin River is the northern component of the Pee Dee River which flows to the Atlantic Ocean near Georgetown, South Carolina.

National protected area
 Blue Ridge Parkway (part)

State and local protected areas/sites 
 Cumberland Knob Recreation Area (part)
 Horne Creek Living Historical Farm
 Pilot Mountain State Park
 Raven Knob Scout Reservation (part)

Adjacent counties
 Patrick County, Virginia - north
 Carroll County, Virginia - north
 Grayson County, Virginia - north
 Stokes County - east
 Forsyth County - southeast
 Yadkin County - south
 Wilkes County - southwest
 Alleghany County - west

Major highways

  (Route Designated from the State boarder with Virginia to Exit 17)

Major infrastructure
 Mount Airy/Surry County Airport
 Elkin Municipal Airport

Demographics

2020 census

As of the 2020 United States census, there were 71,359 people, 28,408 households, and 19,539 families residing in the county.

2000 census
As of the census of 2000, there were 71,219 people, 28,408 households, and 20,482 families residing in the county. The population density was 133 people per square mile (51/km2). There were 31,033 housing units at an average density of 58 per square mile (22/km2). The racial makeup of the county was 90.40% White, 4.16% Black or African American, 0.23% Native American, 0.57% Asian, 0.04% Pacific Islander, 3.45% from other races, and 1.15% from two or more races. 6.49% of the population were Hispanic or Latino of any race.

There were 28,408 households, out of which 30.80% had children under the age of 18 living with them, 58.40% were married couples living together, 9.70% had a female householder with no husband present, and 27.90% were non-families. 25.00% of all households were made up of individuals, and 11.70% had someone living alone who was 65 years of age or older. The average household size was 2.46 and the average family size was 2.92.

In the county, the population was spread out, with 23.60% under the age of 18, 7.90% from 18 to 24, 29.00% from 25 to 44, 24.10% from 45 to 64, and 15.40% who were 65 years of age or older. The median age was 38 years. For every 100 females there were 95.70 males. For every 100 females age 18 and over, there were 92.20 males.

The median income for a household in the county was $33,046, and the median income for a family was $38,902. Males had a median income of $27,854 versus $20,556 for females. The per capita income for the county was $17,722. About 9.10% of families and 12.40% of the population were below the poverty line, including 15.00% of those under age 18 and 17.40% of those age 65 or over.

Government and politics
Surry is at present a predominantly Republican county. The last Democratic Presidential nominee to carry Surry County has been Jimmy Carter in 1976, and no Democrat since 1996 has reached forty percent of the county's vote. Hillary Clinton received only twenty-three percent in 2016, a proportion smaller than Hubert Humphrey obtained in the three-way 1968 race.

In the early 20th century, Surry swung from Democratic-leaning during the Third Party System, to Republican enough to be alongside Yadkin and Stokes County as the only North Carolina counties to vote with William Howard Taft during his disastrous 1912 campaign, back to Democratic enough to support Adlai Stevenson II in 1952.

Surry County is a member of the Piedmont Triad Regional Council. The five-member Board of County Commissioners are elected from single-member districts for four-year staggered terms, with elections in even-numbered years. The board elects a chair and vice-chair, who serve twelve-month terms.

Education
Surry County is divided into three local school systems: Surry County Schools, Mount Airy City Schools, and Elkin City Schools.

Surry County Schools

High schools
 Surry Early College High School of Design (on the Surry Community College campus.)
 East Surry High School
 North Surry High School
 Surry Central High School

Middle schools
 Central Middle School
 Gentry Middle School
 Meadowview Magnet Middle School
 Pilot Mountain Middle School

Elementary schools
 Cedar Ridge Elementary School
 Copeland Elementary School
 Dobson Elementary School
 Flat Rock Elementary School
 Franklin Elementary School
 Mountain Park Elementary School
 Pilot Mountain Elementary School
 Rockford Elementary School
 Shoals Elementary School
 Westfield Elementary School
 White Plains Elementary School

Mount Airy City Schools
 Mount Airy High School
 Mount Airy Middle School
 Jones Intermediate School
 Tharington Primary School

Elkin City Schools
The Elkin City Schools system has 3 schools ranging from pre-kindergarten to twelfth grade: Elkin Elementary School, Elkin Middle School and Elkin High School.

Colleges and universities
Surry Community College, part of the North Carolina Community College System, is the county's only institution for post-secondary education.

Media

Print
Surry County is home to three local newspapers, The Mount Airy News of Mount Airy, The Pilot in Pilot Mountain and The Tribune of Elkin. Additionally, the larger daily Winston-Salem Journal covers news and events in the county. One local newspaper, The Messenger in Mount Airy, ceased operation in approximately 2011.

Broadcast
WIFM in Elkin is a full-time FM radio station. The county has three AM stations, WYZD in Dobson, as well as  WSYD and WPAQ in Mount Airy, both of which operate also on 24-hour FM repeaters that cover most of the county. There are no broadcast television stations in Surry County.

Surry County is part of the Piedmont Triad radio and television market but many broadcasts from the Charlotte market also can be received in Surry County.

Tourism
Surry County is apparently home to the fictitious community of Mayberry from "The Andy Griffith Show", which aired from 1960 through 1967. Andy Griffith reportedly used many things from his hometown in his tv town. Now guests can experience what it was like living in Mayberry by visiting the Andy Griffith Museum, stopping by Andy's homeplace, getting a trim at Floyd's barbershop, taking a ride in a replica Mayberry Squad Car, or even grabbing a bite to eat at Snappy Lunch. Every year in September the city holds the "Mayberry Days" celebration, where fans can come and enjoy the town together.

Communities

City
 Mount Airy (largest city)

Towns
 Dobson (county seat)
 Elkin (also in Wilkes County)
 Pilot Mountain

Census-designated places
 Flat Rock
 Lowgap
 Toast
 White Plains

Townships

 Bryan
 Dobson
 Eldora
 Elkin
 Franklin
 Long Hill
 Marsh
 Mount Airy
 Pilot
 Rockford
 Shoals
 Siloam
 South Westfield
 Stewarts Creek
 Westfield

Unincorporated communities
With  of total land area and only four incorporated municipalities, much of Surry County remains rural. Like much of rural North Carolina, Surry County is dotted with many unincorporated communities, some with rather colorful names. Like many rural communities, these places are centered on churches, schools, post offices, and other common gathering places that developed to serve the needs of a mostly agricultural society.

The United States Geographic Names Information System includes 68 populated places in Surry County. Four of these are the county's incorporated municipalities and seven are historical place names. Of the remaining 57, three have since been annexed by an existing city or town. Elkin Valley and North Elkin have long been part of the town of Elkin and the city of Mount Airy will complete in summer 2007 its annexation of the remaining portions of Hollyview Forest-Highland Park that remain outside of the city.  Additionally, the communities of Jenkinstown and Blevins Store frequently show up on county maps, although they are not officially classified as populated places by the GNIS.

 Albion
 Ararat
 Ash Hill
 Bannertown
 Blackwater
 Blevins Store
 Boones Hill
 Bottom
 Burch
 Cedar Hill
 Combstown
 Copeland
 Crooked Oak
 Crutchfield
 Devotion
 Fairview
 Franklin
 Hills Grove
 Holly Springs
 Indian Grove
 Jenkinstown
 Ladonia
 Level Cross
 Little Richmond
 Long Hill
 Mount Herman
 Mountain Park
 Mulberry
 New Hope
 Oak Grove
 Pine Hill
 Pine Ridge
 Poplar Springs
 Red Brush
 Rockford
 Round Peak
 Salem
 Salem Fork
 Sheltontown
 Shoals
 Siloam
 Slate Mountain
 State Road
 Stony Knoll
 Turkey Ford
 Union Cross
 Union Hill
 Westfield
 White Sulphur Springs
 Woodville
 Zephyr

See also
 List of counties in North Carolina
 National Register of Historic Places listings in Surry County, North Carolina
 North Carolina State Parks
 List of future Interstate Highways
 National Park Service

References

External links

 
 
 The Yadkin Valley Chamber of Commerce
 Surry County Economic Development Partnership
 NCGenWeb Surry County - free genealogy resources for the county

 
Counties of Appalachia
1771 establishments in North Carolina
Populated places established in 1771